Hekate (minor planet designation: 100 Hekate) is a large main-belt asteroid.

About

It orbits in the same region of space as the Hygiea asteroid family, though it is actually an unrelated interloper. It is listed as a member of the Hecuba group of asteroids that orbit near the 2:1 mean-motion resonance with Jupiter.

Hekate was the 100th asteroid to be discovered, by Canadian-American astronomer J. C. Watson (his fourth discovery) on July 11, 1868. It is named after Hecate, the goddess of witchcraft in Greek mythology, but its name also commemorates it as the hundredth asteroid, as ἑκατόν (hekaton) is Greek for 'hundred'.

A Hekatean occultation of a star was observed on July 14, 2003, from New Zealand.

See also
List of minor planets: 1–1000
100000 Astronautica

References

External links 
 
 

S-type asteroids (SMASS)
S-type asteroids (Tholen)
Hygiea asteroids
Hekate
Hekate
18680711
Objects observed by stellar occultation
Hecate